Darkhad (also "Darkhat") is a dialect in-between Central Mongolian and Oirat still variously seen as closer to Oirat or as a dialect of Khalkha Mongolian with some Oirat features. However, it seems to have substantially assimilated to the Khalkha dialect since it first was described by Sanžeev, and some classificational differences seem to be due to what historical (or even ideal) state got classified. Ethnologue reports a population of  without providing a date. Speakers live mainly in the west of Lake Khövsgöl in the sums Bayanzürkh, Ulaan-Uul and Rinchinlkhümbe in the Khövsgöl Province of Mongolia.

Phonetics and phonology

However, monophthongized reflexes of *ai can be encountered and more so in older language material, so it can be assumed that  due to Khalkha influence. Somewhat similar developments can be observed for other vowels, but as at least  and  can get palatalized, it is problematic whether palatalized consonants or fronted vowels have to be considered as phonemes. It patterns with the Oirat dialects of the Mongolian state in that it retains *ŋn  and sometimes has *b > .

Verbal system

Person inflections as in Oirat or Buryat are getting lost, but used to be present. There are both voluntatives (irrespective of number) in –ja/-ji as in Khalkha and –su for first person singular as in Oirat and Buryat, e.g.  ‘let’s burn it’ and  'I shall enter', but the latter form is rare. The benedictive –kti is actively used as holds for Buryat, e.g.  ‘Please, come with us’. Next to the normal concessive in –g/-k ‘s/he may’, there is also a concessive - that marks an order to a third person. The other, fairly unremarkable modal verbal suffixes are the imperative, prescriptive, optative and dubitative. The inventory of indicative finite verbal suffixes contains the usual reflexes of Written Mongolian ⟨-nam⟩, ⟨-luγ-a⟩, ⟨-ǰuqui⟩ and ⟨-ba⟩, the last one being rare as usual. There is a fifth suffix,  (possibly from ⟨-ǰu orkiǰuqui⟩), probably expressing some kind of perfect aspect meaning, that is peculiar to Darkhad, e.g.  ‘has sent’. The participles are the same as in Common Mongolic. However, a thorough analysis of the function of these items in contrast to each other has not been conducted. Furthermore, it used to be possible to negative them with reflexes of ⟨ügei⟩ as in Buryat. Instead of ⟨-maγča⟩ ‘as soon as’, ⟨-nsar⟩ is used.

Nominal system

The case system is the same as in Khalkha, and Oirat plurals like –mud are absent. The pronouns are the same as Khalkha, but a paradigm of the first person plural exclusive without nominative is attested for the old stages of Darkhat (as would hold for Khalkha in the 1930s and still holds for Oirat).

See also
 Darkhads

References

Citations

Bibliography
 Gáspár, Csaba. 2006. Darkhat. München: Lincom.
 Poppe, Nicholas. 1951. Khalkha-mongolische Grammatik. Wiesbaden: Franz Steiner.
 Rinchen, Byambyn (ed.) 1979. Mongol ard ulsyn ugsaatny sudlal helnij shinjleliin atlas. Ulaanbaatar: ŠUA.
 Sanjaa, J. and D. Tuyaa. 2001. Darhad ayalguuny urt egshgiig avialbaryn tövshind sudalsan n’. In: Mongol hel shinjlel 4: 33-50.
 Sanžeev, G. D. 1931. Darhatskij govor i fol’klor. Leningrad.
 Svantesson, Jan-Olof, Anna Tsendina, Anastasia Karlsson, Vivan Franzén. 2005. The Phonology of Mongolian. New York: Oxford University Press.
 Tuyaa, D. and D. Tuul. 2008. Darhad aman ayalguuny tovch tol'. Ulaanbaatar: Ulaanbaatar hevlel.

Languages of Mongolia
Khövsgöl Province
Mongolic languages